Three Days of Rain is a 2002 American film directed by Michael Meredith and starring Penelope Allen, Erick Avari, and Alimi Ballard. Based on Anton Chekhov's short stories, the plot takes place in Cleveland city during a rainstorm. It was the last film to star Peter Falk, famous for playing disheveled detective Columbo.

Plot
Three Days of Rain is a film from 2002 that takes six short stories of Anton Chekov and sets them in modern-day Cleveland, Ohio. The film opens as a storm rolls into Cleveland that will bring rain for three straight days. The film follows six separate people through their unique struggles and challenges. There is a young woman who is forced to give up her daughter and is willing to do anything to be with her. Another character is a cab driver who struggles to cope with the loss of his son. There is Thunder (Michael Santoro), who is a tile maker who is fighting to keep his business from going under, and Denis (Joey Billow), a mentally handicapped Janitor who is faced with losing his job. Through the entire film there is soft jazz and the banter of a local Cleveland disk jockey, the jazz also doubles as the film's soundtrack.

Cast

Main cast
 Penelope Allen as Helen (Credited as Penny Allen)
 Erick Avari as Alex
 Alimi Ballard as Derrick (Credited as Alimi Ballard)
 Joey Bilow as Denis
 Bruce Bohne as Cranston
 Robert Casserly as Ray
 Laurie Coleman as Reporter
 Chuck Cooper as Jim
 Blythe Danner as Woman in Cab
 Peter Falk as Waldo

Supporting cast
 Mark Feuerstein as Car Buyer
 Heather Kafka as Lisa
 Peter Kalos as Ghost
 Christine Karl as Liza
 Merle Kennedy as Tess
 Claire Kirk as Margaret
 George Kuchar as Vendor
 Lyle Lovett as Disc Jockey
 John Carroll Lynch as Dinner Guest
 Don Meredith as John Horton
 Wayne Rogers as Business Man
 Michael Santoro as Thunder
 Peter Henry Schroeder as Amon
 Bill Stockton as Michael
 Maggie Walker as Jen (Credited as Maggi Walker)

Cameo/Uncredited cast
 Robert Carradine as Bus Driver
 Keir Dullea as Extra
 Jordan Elliot as Young Tess
 Jason Patric as Extra
 Max Perlich as Extra
 Frank Gifford as Extra

Credits 
 Director: Michael Meredith
 Script: Michael Meredith
 Executive producer: Philip Bligh, Brad Hillstrom, Christine U. King, Bruce Randolph Tizes
 Producer: Robert Casserly, Bill Stockton

References

External links

2002 films
2002 drama films
2000s English-language films